Athelqueen has been used as a name for a number of ships of the Athel Line.

, built by Furness Shipbuilding, torpedoed  and sunk by Italian submarine Enrico Tazzoli on 15 March 1942
, built by Harland and Wolff as Empire Benefit. In service 1945–55
, built by Barclay, Curle & Co. In service 1966–71, latterly as Anco Queen
, built by Davie Shipbuilders. In service 1977–80

Ship names